The legislative districts of Bataan are the representations of the province of Bataan in the various national legislatures of the Philippines. The province is currently represented in the lower house of the Congress of the Philippines through its first, second and third congressional districts.

History 
Before 1972, Bataan comprised a lone legislative district, electing one representative to the various national legislatures, except during the Japanese occupation of the Philippines when the province sent two representatives to the National Assembly of the Second Philippine Republic. Upon the restoration of the Philippine Commonwealth in 1945, the province continued to comprise a lone district.

The province was represented in the Interim Batasang Pambansa as part of Region III from 1978 to 1984, and elected one representative to the Regular Batasang Pambansa in 1984. Bataan was redistricted into two legislative districts under the new Constitution which took effect on February 7, 1987; both districts elected separate members to the restored House of Representatives starting that same year.

Current Districts 
 NUP (2) 
 Lakas–CMD (1)

Historical Districts

At-Large (defunct)

1943–1944

1984–1986

References 

Bataan
Politics of Bataan